Dogs On Acid, also known as DOA, is a UK-based drum and bass and electronic music website, established in 2001.<ref>DnB | DOA | Drum & Bass Forum Dogs On Acid] Dogsonacid.com, accessed 18 July 2009.</ref>

History
Dogs On Acid began life as a community on Bad Company's website, bcrecordings.com, back in 2000.

On 27 April 2010, the website reached 10 million posts from the forums, with almost 9 million posts on The Board and over a million on The Grid."Dogs On Acid Reaches 10 Million Posts" Its not just music, accessed 28 April 2010.

On 23 September 2013, the forum was taken offline with no explanation as to why it was taken down. In a quickly set up alternative forum, several of the former forum moderators pledged to find a way to resurrect the website. However, in January 2014, the site was relaunched under new ownership, with updated design and servers.

Relaunch
The domain was sold to a new owner "Vexus". On 10 January 2014, a placeholder page appeared on the original domain, stating that the site would be "Renamed. Rebranded. Relaunched". The Facebook account repeated the message on the website, whereas the Twitter account had the message "RIP DOA". However, in late January, the site was relaunched under the name "Mixspace", sporting a new design, but keeping the existing forums and database. Due to the Dogs On Acid branding being more popular, the site soon reverted back to its original name.

Although DJ Fresh is still listed as a shareholder of Dogs On Acid, he recently mentioned that he no longer has anything to do with the running of the forum or website.

Present forum
Next to a community which holds over 87,000 members, the website features: an Editorial section, stores selling merchandise and - in cooperation with Track It Down - online music downloads, an image gallery, an online radio and an audio section, showcasing the latest tracks from the scene. The Grid, the website's music production section, is the birthplace of many new D&B talent. Noisia, Mistabishi, Pendulum, Alix Perez, Danny Byrd and Data to name a few, were regular contributors before gaining any mainstream popularity. Next to this, most D&B artists and promoters are or were regular contributors to the community. Dogs On Acid also runs various music labels: Breakbeat Kaos, Dogs On Acid and Under Construction and promotes and organises various parties worldwide.

The Grid (Production side) holds monthly Q&A Sessions where posters and members get to ask (mainly productive) questions to notable producers and artists. Members of the grid also collaborate to their 'Grid wiki'. The board holds more ambiguous discussions than in its early days. Regardless of the fact that Drum & Bass Isn't discussed as much this hasn't hindered the website; only leading them to receive just as much members as before. The board is still favoured for having discussions and debates on varied music and not just drum and Bass, it brings even notable DJs to post their opinions such as radio one's Grooverider or Mary Anne Hobbs. Mary Anne announced during an interview "Everything happens on-line. The forums and the bloggers are running things - dubstepforum.com and dogsonacid.com are phenomenal". "Internet review: DogsOnAcid more than a PETA nightmare" rwcactivist.com, accessed 22 July 2009. The forum is often compared with dubstepforum like it once was with Drum & Bass Arena.

Public perception, controversy and rivalry
Dogs On Acid's arch-rivals are Drum & Bass Arena. The rivalry spawns from the fact that both portals are arguably the two biggest content-filled websites for the drum and bass genre on the internet. Today the relationship between both forums are light-hearted, where both production sub-forums have competitions for best track and mixes; bringing the comprehensive community together."Maffia Bologna: prossimo live" girodivite.it, accessed 22 July 2009.
Much of DOA's users are considered more international whereas DnB Arena is a site mainly aimed at UK; although a few members post on both.

Pendulum
The drum and bass group Pendulum started much of their activity on DOA, before and during their time being signed to Breakbeat Kaos (BBK), posting on the board and helping other producers on production forum the 'Grid'. During this time DOA was to become the first board to get hit with any news of their releases, also causing the group to be hit with many questions on the production side. Following the success of Pendulum's Slam and Hold Your Colour, Fresh decided to release a compilation CD entitled Jungle Sound Gold Edition. Pendulum responded to the thread stating they had no idea about the release nor gave any permission. Rob Swire responded by admitting no knowledge of the album's release, and that it had nothing to do with the band. Swire also stated they gave Fresh & Adam F low quality tracks to be used for a set and not for releases. We didn't approve and in fact strongly disapprove of the 'Junglesound Gold' artwork, especially in relation to our name being unfairly used as an advertisement – plainly an attempt to link 'Junglesound Gold' to the recent success of Hold Your Colour.
As a result of the above, we do not endorse 'Junglesound Gold' at all.
– Pendulum

This is one of the few threads that caused uproar within the forum and gained over a thousand replies & 141,000 views in the space of four weeks from Rob's post. News of the scandal spread quickly, even being mentioned on Radio 1's Drum & Bass show only a week later. Fresh was also accused by various members for deviously capitalizing on Pendulum's sudden success. Since the incident, Fresh gave his statement (although by this point the CD was out) and Pendulum left the label. On 18 June 2007, Fresh released Pendulum's last 12" single: Blood Sugar / Axle Grinder along with a special edition ‘Hold Your Colour’ CD.

Although Pendulum (which at that time included Rob Swire, Paul Harding and Gareth McGrillen) felt the forum began to become negative and cut ends with BBK & Fresh, they continued posting on the portal. Once the track "Granite" was released, Pendulum became ridiculed by various members for their change in style and being accused of "selling out" for mainstream success. Although the album was highly successful the band continued to receive heavy sarcasm and accusations for killing the genre from various members, described by the board as "haters". Pendulum responded by saying "if we 'killed drum and bass' last time, this is the final nail in its coffin." As the album continued to do well in the mainstream (including Propane Nightmares peaking at #9 in the UK Singles Chart) the band continued to be criticised by DnB enthusiasts, to the point where in March 2009 the band were booed at the Drum and Bass awards from certain enthusiasts for "selling out" "sounding more rock and having a different style to their preceding album"."Sultans of swing - Pendulum Interview" Edinburgh Festival Guide, edinburghfestival.list.co.uk, accessed 21 July 2009. After receiving a heavy amount of criticism Pendulum decided to respond one more time and left the forum and have never posted since.

Accolades
 Nominated for Best Website at the Accelerated Culture Awards 2003, 2nd place
 Nominated for Best Website at the BBC XtraBass Awards 2007, 2nd place
 Mentioned in the July 2008 issue of KMag as one of "the top 100 most important moments in Drum & Bass"
 Nominated for Best Music Forum'' during MTV's second annual Online Music Awards, 2011

See also
 Drum and bass
 Jungle music

References

Drum and bass
Music Internet forums
Internet memes
Internet properties established in 2001
British music websites